Bakhtiyarpur is a town and a municipality notified area, near Patna City in Patna district  in the state of Bihar, India. Bakhtiyarpur is under the Patna Sahib (Lok Sabha constituency), and is a Vidhan Sabha constituency of Bihar in Patna District under the Barh sub-division of Bihar. It is a major railway junction in Danapur railway division, ECR. The incumbent Chief Minister of Bihar, Nitish Kumar belongs to Bakhtiyarpur.

Demographics
 India census, Bakhtiyarpur had a population of 53,223. Males constitute 52.5% of the population and females 47.5%. Bakhtiyarpur has an average literacy rate of 70%, higher than the state average of 61.8%; with 78% of the males and 61.1% of females literate. About 18% of the population is under 6 years of age. Sex ratio is at 903 against the state average of 918. Majority of the residents follow Hinduism, approx. 95%, but there is scant presence of Sikhs and Jains(0.01%) and approx. 5% of Muslims.

Naming
Bakhtiarpur is named after Muhammad bin Bakhtiyar Khalji. He was the military general of Qutb al-Din Aibak, and founded Bakhtiyar city after his conquest of Bengal in 1203, destruction of Nalanda and Vikramshila University.

Transport

Rail link
Bakhtiyarpur railway station is located on the Howrah–Delhi main line and is about 46 km away from Patna. Bakhtiyarpur-Tilaiya line also originates here, connecting Rajgir, Bihar Sharif and Harnaut of Nalanda district up to Tilaiya and to be extended to Koderma Junction railway station.

Air
Lok Nayak Jayaprakash Airport, Patna is the nearest airport. Gaya Airport is also close to Bakhtiyarpur city with a distance of approximately 120 km.

Roads
Bakhtiarpur is connected to Patna by  NH 31, a 4-lane Expressway in the west, and  NH 20 towards south to connect Bihar Sharif up to Ranchi and Barh in the east. Regular bus service is available for these places. It is also connected to Mokama by a 2-lane NH parallel to the Ganga River. A 4-lane bridge Bakhtiyarpur-Tajpur Bridge is also under construction for connecting Patna district to Samastipur district. A state highway road SH 108 between bakhtiyarpur and fatuha which is old NH 30,

Notable people
 Nitish Kumar
 Sheel Bhadra Yajee

References

External links

Cities and towns in Patna district
Neighbourhoods in Patna